Joan Ritz (c. 1882 – 6 November 1956) was a British actress of the silent era.

She was born Jessie Rihll in West Ham, London, UK and died in Brighton, Sussex, England, UK. From 1912 to her death she was married to Percy Nash, who directed numerous of the silent films in which she acted.

Selected filmography
 Enoch Arden (1914)
 The Harbour Lights (1914)
 In the Ranks (1914)
 The Coal King (1915)
 A Rogue's Wife (1915)
 Flying from Justice (1915)
 The Little Minister (1915)
 The Romany Rye (1915)
 Darby and Joan (1920)
 Rodney Stone (1920)
 The Croxley Master (1921)

References

External links
 

1880s births
1956 deaths
English film actresses
English silent film actresses
20th-century English actresses
People from West Ham